Hickory is a census-designated place located in Mount Pleasant Township, Washington County in the state of Pennsylvania.  As of the 2010 census the population was 740 residents.

Demographics

References

Census-designated places in Washington County, Pennsylvania
Census-designated places in Pennsylvania